Gene Frederick Dresselhaus (November 7, 1929, Ancón, Panama – September 29, 2021, California) was an American condensed matter physicist. He is known as a pioneer of spintronics and for his 1955 discovery of the eponymous Dresselhaus effect.

Biography
Dresselhaus studied physics at University of California, Berkeley, receiving his bachelor's degree in 1951 and his doctorate in 1955. At Berkeley he worked under the supervision of Charles Kittel and Arthur F. Kip on early cyclotron resonance experiments on semiconductors and semimetals. As a postdoc Dresselhaus was for the academic year 1955–1956 an instructor at the University of Chicago. From 1956 to 1960 he was an assistant professor at Cornell University. He was also a consultant to General Electric Research Laboratories from 1956 to 1960 and to the Oak Ridge National Laboratory from 1958 to 1960. From 1960 he worked at the Lincoln Laboratory of the Massachusetts Institute of Technology (MIT) and from 1977 at the Francis Bitter National Magnetic Laboratory of MIT. He was also a professor of physics at MIT.

He did research on carbon nanotubes, fullerenes, electronic energy bands in solids, surface impedance of metals, excitons in insulators, electronic surface states, optical properties of solids, and high-temperature superconductivity. He was the author or co-author of over 500 scientific publications.

He was elected in 1966 a Fellow of the American Physical Society. In 2022 he shared the Oliver E. Buckley Condensed Matter Prize with Emmanuel I. Rashba for "pioneering research on spin-orbit coupling in crystals, particularly the foundational discovery of chiral spin-orbit interactions, which continue to enable new developments in spin transport and topological materials." His death in 2021 shortly preceded the announcement of the prize.

In 1958 he married the physicist Mildred Spiewak — for many years the couple extensively collaborated and published their scientific findings. They had a daughter and three sons.

Selected publications

Articles

Books
  (1st edition 1988)
 
  (1st edition 2001)

References

1929 births
2021 deaths
University of California, Berkeley alumni
Massachusetts Institute of Technology faculty
Condensed matter physicists
20th-century American physicists
21st-century American physicists
Fellows of the American Physical Society
Oliver E. Buckley Condensed Matter Prize winners
Cornell University faculty
People from Panamá District
Panamanian people of German descent